Eefsele is a hamlet in the Dutch municipality of Oost Gelre, a part of the province of Gelderland, Netherlands.

It was first mentioned in 1315 or 1316 as Everslo, and means "forest of Evert (person)". It is not a statistical entity, and the postal authorities have placed it under Lievelde. The hamlet was accidentally bombed on 8 February 1945, because the target was a German stronghold in the forest. Eefsele consists of about 80 houses.

References 

Populated places in Gelderland
Oost Gelre